Tekgöz Bridge is a historical bridge in Turkey.

According to the inscription of the bridge it was commissioned by a certain Hacı Alişir from Kayseri in behalf of Süleyman II (1196-1204), the sultan of Seljuks of Anatolia in 1203.

It is a single arch bridge and in fact the name of the bridge tekgöz means "single arch". However it also has an auxiliary arch used only in overflow seasons.

A misconception
Evliya Çelebi, the famous Turkish traveller of the 17th century, tried to read the inscription plate and reading the name Süleyman he thought that the name refers to Süleyman the Magnificent of the Ottoman Empire.

References

External links
For images

History of Kayseri Province
Seljuk bridges in Turkey
Bridges over the Kızılırmak